Naria acicularis, common name the Atlantic yellow cowry, is a species of cowry, a sea snail, a marine gastropod mollusk in the family Cypraeidae, the cowries.

Forms
Although they are of no taxonomic significance, there are two named forms of this species:  form algoensis and form
sanctaehelenae (Schilder, F.A., 1930).

Distribution
This species occurs on the coasts of North Carolina, USA, the Gulf of Mexico, the Caribbean, Venezuela, Colombia and Brazil.

Description 

The maximum recorded adult shell length for this species is 31 mm.

Habitat 
The minimum recorded depth for this species is 0 m; maximum recorded depth is 780 m.

References

Further reading 
 Rosenberg, G., F. Moretzsohn, and E. F. García. 2009. Gastropoda (Mollusca) of the Gulf of Mexico, Pp. 579–699 in Felder, D.L. and D.K. Camp (eds.), Gulf of Mexico–Origins, Waters, and Biota. Biodiversity. Texas A&M Press, College Station, Texas.

Cypraeidae
Gastropods described in 1791
Taxa named by Johann Friedrich Gmelin